() is an uninhabited, roughly circular French atoll that is part of the French Southern and Antarctic Lands. Its exclusive economic zone,  in size, is contiguous with that of Europa Island.

The atoll consists of ten barren rocky islets, with no vegetation, totaling  in area. The reef, whose coastline measures , is entirely covered by the sea from three hours before high tide to three hours afterward. The region is also subject to cyclones, making the atoll a long-time maritime hazard and the site of numerous shipwrecks.

Jaguar Seamount and Hall Tablemount lie, respectively, about  further southwest.

History 
The  was first recorded by Portuguese explorers in the early sixteenth century as the "Baixo da Judia" ("Jewess Shoals"). The Judia ("Jewess", for the ancestry of its owner Fernão de Loronha) was the Portuguese ship that discovered the feature by running aground on it in 1506. The name became "" due to transcription errors by cartographers. The Santiago broke up on the shoal in 1585.

It was rediscovered by the Europa in 1774, whence the name "Europa Rocks". The Malay was lost 27 July 1842 on the Europa Rocks.

In 1897, the shoal became a French possession, later being placed under the administration of a commissioner residing in Réunion in 1968. Madagascar became independent in 1960 and has claimed sovereignty over the shoal since 1972.

Wildlife 
The presence of Galapagos sharks was reported in 2003, which is a first in the Mozambique Channel.

Tourism 
Mooring at  requires a permit from the French Government. Fishing without such a permit may result in the boat being expelled or even confiscated. Several illegal tourism charters departing from Mozambique or South Africa have been seized since 2013 by the French Navy.

Gallery

References

Further reading

External links 

 
 
 Sailing Directions: East Africa and the South Indian Ocean
 French Southern and Antarctic Lands. The World Factbook. Central Intelligence Agency..

Indian Ocean atolls of France
Atolls of Madagascar
Uninhabited islands of France
Islands of the French Southern and Antarctic Lands
Territorial disputes of France
Territorial disputes of Madagascar
France–Madagascar relations